United  of America is a documentary that airs on History and is hosted by Randy and Jason Sklar. The show premiered on May 8, 2012.

Synopsis
The show explores the stories behind the statistics that shaped the history of America.

Episodes

Critical reception
The New York Times' Neil Genlinzer gave the show a positive review. Rob Owens from the Pittsburgh Post-Gazette said that the show wants to be a 30-minute show that was stretched into an hour. The A.V. Club reviewer Phil Dyess-Nugent gave the show a B- and said it was a fun show.

References

External links
 
 
 United Stats of America of TV.com

2010s American documentary television series
2012 American television series debuts
American educational television series
English-language television shows
History (American TV channel) original programming